Rudy Lewis (born Charles Rudolph Harrell; August 23, 1936 – May 20, 1964) was an American rhythm and blues singer known for his work with the Drifters. In 1988, he was posthumously inducted into the Rock and Roll Hall of Fame.

Career
Lewis began his singing career in gospel music. He was one of only two males to have sung with the Clara Ward Singers and sang with the gospel group right up to the day before he auditioned for George Treadwell at Philadelphia's Uptown Theater where he was hired on the spot. Lewis joined the Drifters as lead vocalist, replacing departed group member Ben E. King, and ended up performing most of King's repertoire live in concert.

Lewis was the lead vocalist for a string of hits: "Please Stay", "Some Kind of Wonderful", "Up On The Roof" and "On Broadway". He also featured on other tracks such as: "Another Night With The Boys", "Beautiful Music", "Jackpot", "Let The Music Play", "Loneliness Or Happiness", "Mexican Divorce", "Only In America", "Rat Race", "She Never Talked To Me That Way", "Somebody New Dancing With You", "Stranger On The Shore", "Vaya Con Dios" and "What To Do".

In April 1963, Lewis recorded his solo single "Baby I Dig Love" along with the B-side "I've Loved You So Long". The record was released the following month, but never reached the charts. He was a member of the Drifters from late 1960 until his untimely death in 1964. In 1988, Lewis was inducted into the Rock and Roll Hall of Fame as a member of the Drifters.

Personal life
Lewis was born in Philadelphia, Pennsylvania. He moved to New York City at the age of 24 after joining the Drifters. According to Billy Vera, Lewis was a closeted homosexual, addicted to heroin and suffered from binge eating disorder. It was kept secret from the general public until the release of the liner notes of the CD box set Rockin & Driftin: The Drifters Box (1996).

Death
On May 21, 1964, when the group was due to record "Under the Boardwalk" which had been written for Lewis, he was found dead in his Harlem hotel room from the previous night. Former lead vocalist Johnny Moore was brought back to perform lead vocals for the recording. The next day, the Drifters recorded "I Don't Want to Go On Without You" which was led by Charlie Thomas in tribute to Lewis.

An autopsy was never performed and authorities ruled his death as a probable drug overdose. However, close friends and family believe he died from a mixture of a drug overdose, asphyxiation and a heart attack. Dying at the age of 27 made Lewis an early member of the 27 Club.

Discography

Solo singles

References

External links

1936 births
1964 deaths
American soul singers
Deaths by heroin overdose in New York (state)
Drug-related deaths in New York City
American gay musicians
LGBT African Americans
LGBT people from Pennsylvania
American LGBT singers
Musicians from Philadelphia
The Drifters members
Singers from New York City
20th-century African-American male singers
Singers from Pennsylvania